Willie (Wiremu) Hona is a New Zealand musician.

Hona's career began alongside Mark Williams, Mack Tane and Gregg Findlay in the band the Face.

In 1983 he released "She Needs You" (WEA) and it reached #41 on the New Zealand Charts.

In 1983 he also joined Herbs as singer and guitarist. He appear on two albums, Long Ago (1984) and Sensitive to a Smile (1987) and on multiple singles such as top ten songs "Slice of Heaven" (Dave Dobbyn with Herbs),"Sensitive to a Smile" and "Listen". He left the band in late 1988.

In 1991 he released a solo album Keep an Open Heart.

Discography

Singles

Awards

Aotearoa Music Awards
The Aotearoa Music Awards (previously known as New Zealand Music Awards (NZMA)) are an annual awards night celebrating excellence in New Zealand music and have been presented annually since 1965.

! 
|-
| 2012 || Willie Hona (as part of Herbs) || New Zealand Music Hall of Fame ||  || 
|-

References

20th-century New Zealand male singers
Living people
Year of birth missing (living people)
New Zealand male guitarists